"Hey! Little Girl" is a song written and performed by American musician Del Shannon.

Background
It was recorded in October 1961 and was released later that year. In the lyrics, the narrator professes his love to a girl that he only barely knows. The girl has recently been dumped by her boyfriend, but the narrator proposes to begin a relationship with her and thus make her feel better. As such, the song is more optimistic than some of Shannon's other songs, such as "Runaway" and "Keep Searchin' (We'll Follow the Sun)". The background music involves both string and brass instruments.

Chart performance
"Hey! Little Girl" reached No. 38 in the US Billboard Hot 100 chart, but was a much bigger hit in the United Kingdom, where it reached No. 2.

References

1961 singles
Del Shannon songs
1961 songs
Songs written by Del Shannon